The Liberal Party was a Greek liberal political party, founded in 1981, which claimed to be the continuation of the historical Liberal Party, one of Greece's leading parties for most of the early 20th century. The party was founded by Nikitas Venizelos, grandson of the original party's founder and leader, Eleftherios Venizelos.

Since 1999, the party was led by the retired military officer Manolis Kalligiannis (Μανώλης Καλλιγιάννης, sometimes referred to as Emmanuel Kalligiannis). After Kalligiannis attended the Rome convention of the eurosceptic pan-European alliance Libertas.eu in May 2009, the party run under the title "Liberal Party – Libertas.eu" for the 2009 European Parliament elections.

Electoral results

References

External links
 Official website of Liberal Party

Liberal parties in Greece
Libertas.eu
Political parties established in 1980
1980 establishments in Greece